Muravey Georgiev Radev (born 6 May 1947) is a Bulgarian politician who served as Minister of Finance in the Kostov government between 1997 and 2001.

Life

Born in Sofia, Radev completed his university studies in Varna, specializing in the economics of industry. In the 1990s, he became a member of the UDF. He has been elected to three National Parliaments.

In 2004, he was one of the founders (alongside Ivan Kostov) of the DSB.

Radev is married and has two children.

References 

1947 births
Living people
Politicians from Sofia
Finance ministers of Bulgaria
Government ministers of Bulgaria
Members of the National Assembly (Bulgaria)
Union of Democratic Forces (Bulgaria) politicians